The Bougainville whistler (Pachycephala richardsi) or Bougainville hooded whistler, is a species of bird in the family Pachycephalidae. It is found on Bougainville Island, east of New Guinea. Its natural habitat is subtropical or tropical moist montane forests. The Bougainville whistler was split from the Hooded whistler in 2014.

References

Bougainville whistler
Birds of Bougainville Island
Bougainville whistler